Pseudomonas migulae is a fluorescent, Gram-negative, rod-shaped bacterium isolated from natural mineral waters in France. This bacterium has also been isolated from endophytic tissues of lodgepole pine trees growing on gravel mining sites with potential to perform biological nitrogen fixation and plant growth promotion. Based on 16S rRNA analysis, P. migulae has been placed in the P. fluorescens group.

References

External links
Type strain of Pseudomonas migulae at BacDive -  the Bacterial Diversity Metadatabase

Pseudomonadales
Bacteria described in 1999